George Louis of Nassau-Dillenburg (4 March 1618 – 19 May 1656) was Hereditary Prince of Nassau-Dillenburg.

Early life 
He was the son of Prince Louis Henry, Prince of Nassau-Dillenburg and his wife, Countess Katharina of Sayn-Wittgenstein (1588-1651), daughter of Louis I, Count of Sayn-Wittgenstein and his second wife, Countess Elisabeth von Solms-Laubach (1549-1599).

Marriage 
George Louis married on 19 February 1638 in Coppenbrügge to Princess Anna Augusta of Brunswick-Wolfenbüttel (1612-1673), the daughter of Henry Julius, Duke of Brunswick-Wolfenbüttel and Elizabeth of Denmark.

Death 
He never inherited the principality, because he died before his father. George Louis died on 19 August 1656 at the age of 38 and was buried in Dillenburg the next day.

Issue 
 Elisabeth Catherine (1639-1641)
 Sophia Eleonora (1640-1712)
 Henry (1641-1701), succeeded George Louis's father as Prince of Nassau-Dillenburg
 Elisabeth Charlotte (1643-1686), married to Count Ferdinand Gobert von Aspremont-Lynden
 stillborn son (1645)
 Elisabeth Louise (1648-1670)
 Anna Catherine (b. 1651)

References

House of Nassau
Princes of Nassau
1618 births
1656 deaths
17th-century German people
Sons of monarchs
Heirs apparent who never acceded